Saanichton, British Columbia is a village, in the municipality of Central Saanich, located between Victoria and the BC Ferry Terminal, west of the Pat Bay Highway (Hwy 17), at the junction of Mount Newton Cross Road and East Saanich Road.

Saanichton hosts the Saanich Pioneer Museum dedicated to the history of settlement of the Saanich Peninsula.

Climate

References

Populated places in the Capital Regional District
Saanich Peninsula